Aias Salamina Football Club  (Ajax of Salamis in English) is a Greek football club based in Salamina, Salamis Island. The association was founded in 1931.

History
In the 1960s and 1970s it played in high leagues against the likes of Olympiacos, Panathinaikos, AEK Athens or PAOK, and many others . After many years in the lower tiers, Aias secured promotion to the third, professional, league of the Greek pyramid in 2007. The pitch is on the road between Salamis city and Aianteio and seats 1500 visitors. The team colours are blue and white.

In the past Aias had gained many championships and cups in lower Hellenic divisions . The club had many emerging players who, after successful stints with Aias, eventually moved to larger Greek teams.

Aias Salaminas derives its name from the Salaminan king Ajax the Great.

Current squad

Positions
1959–60: Piraeus Premier Division: 4th
1960–61: Piraeus Premier Division: 6th
1961–62: Piraeus Premier Division: 6th
1962–63: Piraeus Premier Division: 2nd
1963–64: Beta Ethniki: 12th
1964–65: Piraeus Premier Division: 1st
1965–66: Beta Ethniki: 9th
1966–67: Beta Ethniki: 8th
1967–68: Beta Ethniki: 15th
1968–69: Beta Ethniki: 15th
1969–70: Beta Ethniki: 7th
1970–71: Beta Ethniki: 10th
1971–72: Beta Ethniki: 9th
1972–73: Beta Ethniki: 11th
1973–74: Beta Ethniki: 18th
1974–75: Beta Ethniki: 12th
1975–76: Piraeus Premier Division: 1st
1976–77: Piraeus Premier Division
1977–78: Piraeus Premier Division: 2nd
1978–79: Piraeus Premier Division: 5th
1979–80: Piraeus Premier Division: 1st
1980–81: Gamma Ethniki: 3rd
1981–82: Gamma Ethniki: 5th
1982–83: Delta Ethniki: 2nd
1983–84: Delta Ethniki: 1st
1984–85: Gamma Ethniki: 21st
1985–86: Delta Ethniki: 14th
1986–87: Piraeus Premier Division: 8th
1987–88: Piraeus Premier Division: 6th
1988–89: Piraeus Premier Division: 10th
1989–90: Piraeus Premier Division: 6th
1990–91: Piraeus Premier Division: 1st
1991–92: Delta Ethniki: 10th
1992–93: Delta Ethniki: 13th
1993–94: Delta Ethniki: 17th
1994–95: Piraeus Premier Division: 8th
1995–96: Piraeus Premier Division: 8th
1996–97: Piraeus Premier Division
1997–98: Piraeus Premier Division: 2nd
1998–99: Piraeus Premier Division: 1st
1999–2000: Piraeus Premier Division: 1st
2000–01: Delta Ethniki: 14th
2001–02: Piraeus Premier Division: 1st
2002–03: Delta Ethniki: 7th
2003–04: Delta Ethniki: 3rd
2004–05: Delta Ethniki: 3rd
2005–06: Delta Ethniki: 5th
2006–07: Delta Ethniki: 1st
2007–08: Gamma Ethniki: 8th
2008–09: Gamma Ethniki: 13th
2009–10: Gamma Ethniki: 12th
2010–11: Football League 2: 10th
2011–12: Delta Ethniki: 12th
2012–13: Piraeus Premier Division: 16th
2013–14: Piraeus Second Division: 2nd
2014–15: Piraeus Premier Division: 9th
2015–16: Piraeus Premier Division: 16th
2016–17: Piraeus Second Division: 2nd
2017–18: Piraeus Premier Division: 6th
2018–19: Piraeus Premier Division: 3rd
2019–20: Piraeus Premier Division: 1st
2020–21: Delta Ethniki: 4th
2021–22: Gamma Ethniki: 9th

Since 1959–60:

 11 seasons in Beta Ethniki
 8 seasons in Gamma Ethniki
 14 seasons in Delta Ethniki
 29 seasons in Piraeus Premier Division
 2 seasons in Piraeus Second Division

External links
 Unofficial website

Football clubs in Attica
Salamis Island
Association football clubs established in 1931
1931 establishments in Greece
Gamma Ethniki clubs